Racquetball has been part of the Pan American Games since 1995 Games in Mar del Plata, Argentina, although it was not included in the 2007 Games. Racquetball was again included in the 2011 Pan American Games in Guadalajara, Mexico,  2015 Pan American Games in Toronto, Ontario, and 2019 Pan American Games in Lima, Peru. Racquetball is on the program for the 2023 Pan American Games in Santiago, Chile. The United States dominated the racquetball events in the first three games, but Mexico has been the dominant country in the last three games, winning all nine gold medals in the women's events and five of the nine gold medals in the men's events.

Medal table

Men

Singles

Doubles

Team

Women

Singles

Doubles

Team

Events

External links
International Racquetball Federation website

 
Sports at the Pan American Games
Pan American Games